Kasirye Martin, popularly known by his stage name Mc Tino (born  in Jinja, Uganda to Baramaze John and Veronique Tebasura) is a Rwandan artist and journalist, MC and Dejeey.

Early life and education 
He studied at the University of Rwanda in the Department of Business Administration (Marketing), in 2010. He continued his studies in India, at the Indian Institute of Mass Communication, where he obtained a diploma in Mass Communication.

Career 
MC Tino released his first album, Umurima, in 2018. There are popular songs like Umurima, Njyewe Nawe , MULA.

He is currently doing a talk show called DUNDA Show on KT Radio.He hosted Ruger, Ladipoe, Stonebwoy, Kataleya and Kandle and Butera Knowless on his radio show called Dunda on KT Radio. He performed as mc when Jason Derulo went to Rwanda

References

Living people
1984 births
Rwandan male singers
People from Jinja District
Ugandan emigrants to Rwanda
Rwandan journalists